Abbot Gian Benedetto Mittarelli, O.S.B. Cam., (2 September 1707 – 14 August 1777) was an Italian monk and monastic historian.

Early life and education
Mittarelli was born in 1707 at Venice and christened Nicola Giacomo. 
At the early age of fourteen, Nicola entered the Camaldolese Order at the Monastery of Saint Michael, established on the island of Murano in the Venetian Lagoon. When he was admitted to the novitiate of the monastery, he was given the name Dom Gian Benedetto, by which he was known for the rest of his life.

Later, he studied theology and philosophy at the monasteries of his Order in Florence and Rome. When he completed his studies, he was assigned to teach these subjects to the younger members of the Order. Because he was not attuned to the scholastic method, his superiors sent him to the Monastery of Saint Parisius in Treviso, where he became a confessor and the archivist of the Order.

Career
In 1760 he was elected Abbot of San Michele, and in 1765, Superior General of his Order for the space of five years during which he resided in Rome. After his term expired, he returned to his monastery in Venice, where he remained as abbot until his death in 1777.

Writings
His monumental work, in the preparation of which he was assisted by his confrères, Dom Anselmo Costadoni and Dom Calogerà, is the "Annales Camaldulenses ordinis S. Benedicti, ab anno 907 ad annum 1770" 9 volumes folio (Venice, 1755–73). It follows the plan of Mabillon's "Annales ordinis S. Benedicti".
 
His other works are
 "Memorie della vita di San Parisio, e del monastero dei Santi Christina e Parisio di Treviso" (Venice, 1748)
 "Memorie del monastero della Santa Trinità di Fænza" (Fænza, 1749)
 "Ad Scriptores rerum Italicarum A. Muratorii accessiones historiæ Faventinæ" (Venice, 1771)
 "De litteratura Faventinorum" (Venice, 1775)
 Bibliotheca codicum manuscriptorum monasterii S. Michaelis Venetiarum prope Murianum una cum Appendice librorum impressorum seculi XV (Venice, 1779; posthumous work)

Sources

 
 

Camaldolese Order
1707 births
1777 deaths
Benedictine scholars
Italian Benedictines
Italian historians of religion
Benedictine abbots
18th-century Venetian historians